is an athletic stadium in Kasuga, Fukuoka, Japan.

External links
Official site

Sports venues in Fukuoka Prefecture
Football venues in Japan
Sports venues completed in 1981
1981 establishments in Japan